Robert Davis Johnson (August 12, 1883 – October 23, 1961) was a U.S. representative from Missouri.

Born on a farm near Slater, Missouri, Johnson was educated in the rural graded schools of his native county, and was graduated from the Portland (Indiana) High School in 1901.
He attended the Missouri Valley College, Marshall, Missouri.
He taught school in Saline Valley and Orearville, Missouri from 1901 to 1907.
He served as clerk of the circuit court of Saline County in 1915–1923.
While serving as clerk, he also studied law.
He was admitted to the bar in 1917 and commenced practice in Marshall, Missouri, in 1923.
He served as prosecuting attorney of Saline County in 1925–1928.

Johnson was elected as a Democrat to the Seventy-second Congress to fill the vacancy caused by the death of Samuel C. Major and served from September 29, 1931, to March 3, 1933.
He was an unsuccessful candidate for renomination in 1932.
He resumed the practice of law in Marshall, Missouri.

Johnson was elected judge of the circuit court and of the 15th Judicial Circuit of Missouri on November 5, 1940, and served until January 1, 1947.

He again resumed the practice of law in Marshall, Missouri, where he died October 23, 1961. He was interred in Ridge Park Cemetery.

References

1883 births
1961 deaths
Missouri Valley College alumni
Missouri state court judges
Democratic Party members of the United States House of Representatives from Missouri
20th-century American judges
People from Saline County, Missouri
People from Marshall, Missouri
20th-century American politicians